Nils-Kristian Lundberg (6 February 1966 – 27 April 2022) was a Swedish author. He was best known for his book ”Yarden” published in 2012. His first book ”Genom September” was published in 1991.

References

1966 births
2022 deaths
21st-century Swedish writers
Writers from Malmö